Priaranza del Bierzo (Priaranza in Galician language) is a village and municipality located in the region of El Bierzo (province of León, Castile and León, Spain) . According to the 2006 census (INE), the municipality has a population of 918 inhabitants.

It is one of Galician speaking councils of El Bierzo

Towns 

 Priaranza del Bierzo / Priaranza
 Villalibre de la Jurisdicción
 Santalla del Bierzo / Santalla
 Paradela de Muces
 Villavieja / A Vilavella
 Cornatel / Cornatelo

Cornatel Castle (Ulver)

References 

Municipalities in El Bierzo